Wolverhampton Wanderers Women's Football Club, commonly known as Wolves Women, is an English women's football club affiliated with Wolverhampton Wanderers F.C. The club play in the FA Women's National League North.

History
The club began playing in 1975 as Heathfield Rovers. After becoming Wolverhampton & Wednesbury Tube LFC the following season, they later settled on Wolverhampton Ladies. Just before 1993–94 the club got permission from Wolverhampton Wanderers to call themselves Wolverhampton Wanderers Women's Football Club and they were promoted to the FA Women's Premier League National Division that season. However, after two seasons they were relegated back to the Northern Division. Rachel Unitt came through the club's youth system and scored 12 goals in 1999-00 before signing for Everton the following season.

In May 2001 Dennis Mortimer was appointed manager. He challenged for promotion in his three seasons in charge but left in 2004, citing work commitments. In 2004–05 Wolves Women were runners-up to Sunderland but star players Emily Westwood and Amy McCann left for Everton during the summer and the club finished sixth in 2005–06.

Wolves Women were relegated to the Midland Combination after finishing 11th in 2006–07. In May 2008 the club was boosted by full affiliation with Wolverhampton Wanderers and a partnership with Wolverhampton College.

On Thursday 19 April 2012 Wolves Women won the Midland Combination Title gaining promotion back to the Northern Division for the 2012–13 Season. They followed that up with a 2–0 win over rivals Stoke in the League Cup Final to complete the League and cup double.

The 2014–15 season for Wolves Women was one to forget. They saw themselves relegated and bottom of the Northern Division. Wolves only managed 8 points from 22 games, and this saw a change in coaching staff at the end of the season.

At the start of the 2015–16 season, Steve Cullis was named manager and has been given the aim of promotion back into the Northern Division, as well as developing the youth section of the club. Wolves also withdrew their reserve team from the FA Women's Premier League Reserves (Midlands), the reserves had been playing in the WPL for the past 13 seasons.

In October 2016, Cullis moved to a new role of Technical Director for the club's Regional Talent Centre. Tim Dudding was named as his replacement as manager of the Senior squad. Dudding led a successful campaign, resulting in the club's promotion to the Northern Division.

After a poor start to the season Dan McNamara took over as First Team Manager in early 2018 and led the team in a relegation battle, just missing out on goal difference after a hard-fought campaign. After the restructure of the women's football pyramid this summer, the team now find themselves in the new FA Women's National League Midlands Division One. For the 2018–19 season the club have introduced a Development Team.

At the end of the 2020–21 season, Wolves were promoted via 'upward movement' to the FA Women's National League North. In the subsequent season (2021–22), Wolves secured a place in the play-off with a chance for another promotion, this time to the FA Women’s Championship, beating Sheffield F.C. Ladies 2-0 with 3 games left until the end of the season. They would go on to lose the play-off 1–0 to Southern Division winners Southampton F.C.

Stadium

Wolves Women play their home games at the New Bucks Head in Telford, the home of A.F.C. Telford United.

Players

First team squad

Former players

Regional Talent Club
Wolves Girls Regional Talent Club is a Tier 3 Facility responsible for the delivery of elite girls' football development that commenced operations in June 2016.
The Regional Talent Club's Technical Director is Jenna Burke-Martin.

Other teams
Wolverhampton Wanderers Development Team compete in the FA Women's National Reserve League Midland Division 2. Home games are played at Compton Park, The Wolves Training Ground

Club officials

Coaching staff
 Head of Women's and Girls' Football: Jenna Burke-Martin 
 First Team Manager: Daniel McNamara
 First Team Assistant Manager: Marcus Webber
 Reserve Team Manager: Tom Warren
 Reserve Team Assistant Manager: 
 First Team Goalkeeper Coach: Hugh McCluskie
 First Team Fitness Coach: Roy Williams
 First Team Physio: Jenny Stretton and Paul Taylor
 First Team S&C Coach: Nathan Maxfield
• First Team Human Performance : Nick Hitchman
RTC staff
 Under 16 Head Coach: Josh Darlington
 Under 16 Assistant Coach: 
 Under 14 Head Coach: Danny Heath
 Under 14 Assistant Coach: Martyn Beards
 Under 12 Head Coach: Greg Warren
 Under 12 Assistant Coach: Tom Wellings
 Under 10 Head Coach: Steve Millichamp
 Under 10 Assistant Coach: Liam Turner

Club Committee
 Owner: Wolverhampton Wanderers Foundation
 Chair: Jenny Wilkes
 Secretary: Brian Churm
 Committee members: Andy Butler, Brian Churm, Steve Cullis, Pete Myatt, James Orotayo

Notable former players
Former Wolves players to have played at senior international level.
  Emily Westwood
  Rachel Unitt
  Jody Handley
  Amy McCann
  Kerrie Manley

Honours
2016/17 FA Women's Premier League Midlands Division One Winner

References

External links
Official site
Team details at the FA.com
Club history

Women's football clubs in England
Wolves Women
Sport in Wolverhampton
1975 establishments in England
FA Women's National League teams